Crown Burgers is a small hamburger fast food restaurant chain based in Salt Lake City, Utah started in 1978 by Nick Katsanevas and John Katzourakis.

The chain is known for its signature burger, the "Crown Burger," a cheeseburger which also includes hot pastrami.  Crown Burgers' pastrami cheeseburger has been widely imitated and has become a staple of restaurant cuisine in Salt Lake City, with seven locations. Crown Burgers also carries its own version of the regional condiment fry sauce, a combination of ketchup, mayonnaise and spices.

In 2010, Crown was featured in an episode of Travel Channel's Man v. Food, and was named as serving The Official Best Burgers of Utah in 2011.

Crown Burgers is such a fixture in the Salt Lake Valley that in the London production of The Book of Mormon musical, the Crown Burgers logo can be seen on the backdrop for Salt Lake City stage scenes.

See also
 List of hamburger restaurants

References

External links

 

Fast-food chains of the United States
Fast-food hamburger restaurants
Restaurants in Utah
Companies based in Utah
Utah cuisine
Regional restaurant chains in the United States
Restaurants established in 1978
Buildings and structures in Salt Lake City
1978 establishments in Utah
American companies established in 1978